Warnborough Green is a village in the civil parish of Odiham in Hampshire, England. It lies approximately 1 mile (1.75 km) north-east from Odiham.

Villages in Hampshire
Odiham